Torrile is a comune (municipality) in the Province of Parma in the Italian region Emilia-Romagna, located about  northwest of Bologna and about  north of Parma. 

Torrile borders the following municipalities: Colorno, Mezzani, Parma, Sissa Trecasali.

Main sights
In the comune is the pieve of Gainago, known from 1144 and dedicated to St. John the Baptist. It houses 13th-century frescoes with a Deposition, Saint and Madonna with Child. Another sight is the Torre ("Tower") from which the commune takes its name, located in the frazione of Gainago. The patrician Villa Balduino-Serra is home to a large garden and park.

Economy
The town is home to Erreà, which is one of the leading sportswear producers of Italy.

References

External links
 Official website

Cities and towns in Emilia-Romagna